A partial lunar eclipse took place on Wednesday, July 28, 1999, the second of two lunar eclipses in 1999.

Visibility

Related lunar eclipses

Eclipses of 1999 
 A penumbral lunar eclipse on January 31.
 An annular solar eclipse on February 16.
 A partial lunar eclipse on July 28.
 A total solar eclipse on August 11.

Lunar year series

Half-Saros cycle
A lunar eclipse will be preceded and followed by solar eclipses by 9 years and 5.5 days (a half saros). This lunar eclipse is related to two total solar eclipses of Solar Saros 126.

Tritos series 
 Preceded: Lunar eclipse of July 17, 1992
 Followed: Lunar eclipse of June 26, 2010

Tzolkinex 
 Preceded: Lunar eclipse of June 15, 1992
 Followed: Lunar eclipse of September 7, 2006

See also 
List of lunar eclipses
List of 20th-century lunar eclipses

References

External links 
 Saros cycle 119
 Partial Lunar Eclipse 28 July 1999
 

1999-07
1999 in science
July 1999 events